Dizney is an unincorporated community in Harlan County, Kentucky, United States. Its post office  was active from 1918 until 1993.

Dizney was probably named for local educator Elizah Franklin Dizney.

References

Unincorporated communities in Harlan County, Kentucky
Unincorporated communities in Kentucky